A number of steamships were named Antigone, including -

, a cargo ship which carried this name for four days before being commissioned into the United States Navy.
, a British cargo ship torpedoed and sunk during World War II.

Ship names